The Distrito Nacional is the professional male volleyball team representing Distrito Nacional.

History
The team was found in 2007, the inaugural season of the Dominican Republic Volleyball League. This year the team won the championship, guided by Amaury Martínez who became Most Valuable Player. The 2008 season, repeated the League Championship, with Amaury being awarded MVP again. 

For the 2010 season, the team won the third straight championship, this time with the help of Jose Miguel Caceres, who became Most Valuable Player.

Current squad
As of December 2008

 Coach:  Duglas Mayobanex
 Assistant coach:  Julio Frias

Palmares

National competition
 2007, 2008 & 2010 National League Championship

References

External links
League official website

2007 establishments in the Dominican Republic
Dominican Republic volleyball clubs
Volleyball clubs established in 2007